Tricetin 3',4',5'-O-trimethyltransferase (FOMT, TaOMT1, TaCOMT1, TaOMT2) is an enzyme with systematic name S-adenosyl-L-methionine:tricetin 3',4',5'-O-trimethyltransferase. This enzyme catalyses the following chemical reaction

 3 S-adenosyl-L-methionine + tricetin  3 S-adenosyl-L-homocysteine + 3',4',5'-O-trimethyltricetin (overall reaction)
(1a) S-adenosyl-L-methionine + tricetin  S-adenosyl-L-homocysteine + 3'-O-methyltricetin
(1b) S-adenosyl-L-methionine + 3'-O-methyltricetin  S-adenosyl-L-homocysteine + 3',5'-O-dimethyltricetin
(1c) S-adenosyl-L-methionine + 3',5'-O-dimethyltricetin  S-adenosyl-L-homocysteine + 3',4',5'-O-trimethyltricetin

The enzyme from Triticum aestivum catalyses the sequential O-methylation of tricetin via 3'-O-methyltricetin, 3',5'-O-methyltricetin to 3',4',5'-O-trimethyltricetin.

References

External links 
 

EC 2.1.1
O-methylated flavones metabolism